Saint-Denis (also known as St. Denis and St-Denis) was a federal electoral district in Quebec, Canada, that was represented in the House of Commons of Canada from 1917 to 1997.

This riding was created in 1914 as "St. Denis" from parts of Maisonneuve riding.

St. Denis riding was abolished in 1947 when it was redistributed into Papineau (electoral district) and into a successor district, "St-Denis".

In 1952, the district was abolished, and a new riding, "Saint-Denis" was created.

In 1996, the riding was abolished.

Members of Parliament

This riding elected the following Members of Parliament:

Election results

St. Denis, 1917–1953

St-Denis, 1949–1953

Saint-Denis, 1953–1997

 
|Capital familial
|Henri-Georges Grenier||align=right|393 

By-election: On Mr. Denis' resignation, 27 December 1963

 
|Parti républicain
|Paul Ferron||align=right|183
 
|Parti humain familial
|Henri-Georges Grenier||align=right|  68

 
|Ouvrier indépendant
|Fernando-Avila Panneton||align=right|352

See also 

 List of Canadian federal electoral districts
 Past Canadian electoral districts

External links 

Former federal electoral districts of Quebec